Parkside may refer to:

Australia 
Parkside, Queensland, a suburb in the City of Mount Isa
Parkside, South Australia

Canada 
Parkside, Saskatchewan, a village in the Canadian province of Saskatchewan

New Zealand
Parkside, New Zealand, a suburb of Timaru

United Kingdom
Parkside, Barrow-in-Furness, an area and ward in Cumbria
Parkside, Cambridge, one of the streets that bounds Parker's Piece
Parkside, an area of Cleland, North Lanarkshire
Parkside, County Durham, a community
Parkside, Hunslet, a former rugby league stadium in Hunslet, Leeds
Parkside, Shotts, a football ground in Shotts

United States 
Parkside, San Francisco, California, a neighborhood
Parkside, Indiana, an unincorporated community
Parkside, Camden, New Jersey, a neighborhood
Parkside, Trenton, New Jersey, a neighborhood
Parkside, Pennsylvania, a borough in Delaware County, Pennsylvania, United States
Parkside, Philadelphia, Pennsylvania, a neighborhood in the West Philadelphia area
University of Wisconsin–Parkside, Kenosha, Wisconsin, or its athletic program, the Parkside Rangers

See also
Parkside Colliery, an old coal mine in Merseyside, England
Parkside railway station (disambiguation)
Parkside School (disambiguation)
Parkside Elementary School (disambiguation)